is a monthly shōnen manga magazine published in Japan by Kodansha. It was launched in 1964 under the name . After suspension in 1974 it started publishing again, in 1975 it was renamed as current magazine title. 

It has a supplement magazine called Shōnen Magazine R, which launched in 2015. The magazine originally published a new issue once every two months, until it became a digital-only magazine in October 2019 with a monthly schedule. In January 2023, Shōnen Magazine R will cease publication. In February 2023, a new web publication called Getsu Maga Kichi (Monthly Magazine Base) will replace Shōnen Magazine R.



Manga series

Currently running manga series

Completed series serialized in Monthly Shonen Magazine

1970s 
Spider-Man: The Manga (writers Kōsei Ono and Kazumasa Hirai, illustrator Ryoichi Ikegami) (January 1970 – September 1971)

1980s 
  (Kei Sadayasu) (February 1981 – May 2014)
  (Takeshi Maekawa) (December 1983 – February 1997)
  (Juzo Tokoro) (June 1984 – May 1992)
 Shura no Mon (Masatoshi Kawahara) (April 1987 – November 1996)
 1+2=Paradise (Sumiko Kamimura) (1988-1990)
  (Katsuyuki Toda) (1989 – 1996)
 ANGEL♥BEAT (Ichiru Yasuhara) (1989 – 1996)
 Dear Boys (Hiroki Yamagi) (16 December 1989 – 17 March 1997)

1990s 
  (Yoshito Yamahara) (1993 – 2007)
 Dear Boys:Act II (Hiroki Yagami) (1997 – 2008)
  (Takeshi Maekawa) (1997 – 2004)
  (Harold Sakuishi) (November 1999 – April 2008)

2000s 
  (Hirofumi Sawada) (November 2000 – May 2007)
  (Masahito Soda) (March 2003 – March 2013)
  (Motohiro Katou) (October 6, 2001 – December 6, 2004)
 Yatagarasu (Aihara Tsukasa) (2002 - April 6, 2011)
  (Tadashi Kawashima) (October 2003 – February 6, 2010)
  (December 6, 2005 – August 6, 2007)
   (Hirofumi Sawada) (July 2007 – April 2015)
 Dear Boys:Act III (Hiroki Yagami) (December 2008 – December 2015)
  (Motohiro Katou) (October 2005 – August 2020)

2010s 
 (Masatoshi Kawahara) (2010 – 2014)
 (Marimo Ragawa) (2010 - 2022)
 (Naoshi Arakawa) (April 6, 2011 – February 6, 2015)
Dear Boys: Over Time (Hiroki Yagami) (February 2016 – January 6, 2017)
 (Kōji Kumeta) (December 2015 – July 2020)
 (Naoshi Arakawa) (May 2016 – December 2020)
 (Azami Yō/Kagami Takaya) (June 2017 - February 2022)
 (Takahiro Wakamatsu), (Hiroshi Noda) (October 2019 - November 2022)

References

External links 
 Monthly Shōnen Magazine Website 

1964 establishments in Japan
Magazines established in 1964
Kodansha magazines
Shōnen manga magazines
Monthly manga magazines published in Japan